The Surf Trio was a surf rock band which formed in Eugene, Oregon, in 1984.

Lineup
Founding members included Ron Kleim on guitar and vocals, Pete Weinberger on guitar and vocals, Dave Meyers on bass and Aaron Temple on drums.  Dave Meyers was replaced by Jeff Martin shortly after the release of their first E.P. on Moxie records in 1985.  Terrence Kerrigan, from The Bo Diddley Headhunters, replaced Aaron Temple in August 1988 and was with the band through June 1989, when he, Martin and Weinberger, Joel Barnett, founding member of the Miracle Workers and the Bo Diddley Headhunters, and Richard Spaugh from Drivetrain and previously Dimension 7 formed The Wicked Ones.

Tim Erickson and Chuck Thompson handled the drum duties at various times during the Surf Trio's reformation in the mid-to-late 1990s.

Style
The Surf Trio recorded and played mostly original material; instrumental surf, 60's garage, pop-punk and Ramones influenced punk rock.  The band, along with The Miracle Workers and Dead Moon from Portland, Girl Trouble from Tacoma, and The Mono Men from Bellingham, were a part of the Pacific Northwest's 60s-influenced, garage rock music scene during the mid-to-late 1980s.

Releases
The group has a long list of releases on indie labels including Voxx, Moxie Records, September Gurls, BloodRed Records and Discs, Get Hip, Pin-Up and several others.

Discography

The Surf Trio - 7-inch EP, Moxie Records, 1985
Almost Summer - LP, Voxx Records, 1986
Safari in a Living Graveyard - LP, Moxie Records, 1989
"Strychnine" track on Here AIN'T The Sonics-Tribute Album - LP, Estrus/PopLlama, 1989
Safari in a Living Graveyard - LP, Star Records (Canada) 1989; reissued on CD, Blood Red Vinyl & Discs, 1996.
The Surf Trio Unreleased - Moxie Records, 1991
The Surf Trio - Compilation, September Gurls Records, 1992
Surf Trio/Marble Orchard/Wicked Ones Double 7-inch - September Gurls Records, 1993
Shook Outta Shape - LP/CD, September Gurls Records, 1994
Steamer/Another Girl, Another Planet - 7-inch, Pin-Up Records, 1994
Locked Into Surf Vol. 2" comp- LP/CD, Alopecia Records, 1994
Curse of the Surf Trio - LP/CD, Pin-Up Records, 1995
Hang 10/Mile Zero - 7-inch Blood Red Vinyl, 1995
King of Cool/Salt Bath - 7-inch, Roto Records, 1996
Splitsville split CD with Psychotic Youth -Wolverine/Pin-Up Records, 1996
Surf Trio/Boss Martians split 7-inch, Blood Red Vinyl, 1998
"Back to My Cave" track on Blood Red Battle Royal comp Blood Red Vinyl LP/CD, 1998
"Forbidden Sounds" - LP/CD, Dionysus Records/Blood Red Vinyl, 1999
"Wildcat" track on "Takin' out the Trash: A Tribute to the Trashmen" comp, Double Crown Records, 1999

Venues
Surf Trio played famous Northwest clubs like Club Satyricon, The Blue Gallery, The Pine Street Theatre, Starry Night, The Off-Ramp, Max's, The W.O.W. Hall, with dozens of gigs in Bellingham, Seattle, Portland, Salem and Eugene.  The band shared the stage with such groups as The Stray Cats, The Young Fresh Fellows, The Lyres, Dead Moon, The Mono Men, and Girl Trouble.  A 1995 show in Bellingham, Washington, with the Boss Martians and the Astronauts (From Germany) was video taped. 
Surf Trio toured Germany in 1994 and 1997.
The band played three California gigs; one in L.A. at Greg Shaw's "Cavern Club" while recording their Voxx L.P. "Almost Summer" and two shows at the Purple Onion in San Francisco.

The band continued to play Northwest clubs and recorded their final L.P. "Forbidden Sounds" in 1999.

Interregnum

Aaron Temple left the band in 1988, and now lives in Eugene, Oregon, with his wife and daughter. Members of the band, after 1989, went on to perform in groups such as Marble Orchard, The Wicked Ones, The Peppermint Gearshift, A Few Chairs, and The Romaines before the band reformed in 1994. In 1990, after corresponding with Rudi Protrudi, and departing The Wicked Ones, Terrence Kerrigan auditioned for the drum spot with a Los Angeles incarnation of The Fuzztones.

External links
[ Surf Trio] at Allmusic
Surf Trio fan page

Musical groups from Eugene, Oregon
Surf music groups
Garage rock groups from Oregon
1984 establishments in Oregon
1989 disestablishments in Oregon
Musical groups established in 1984
Musical groups disestablished in 1989
Musical groups reestablished in 1994